Chantilly cake may refer to different regional American cakes.

In the southern United States
In the southern United States, the Chantilly cake may refer to a frosted sponge cake layered with Crème Chantilly, a type of whipped cream, and berries. The Berry Chantilly Cake was made famous by baker Chaya Conrad while working at a Whole Foods in New Orleans.

In Hawaii
In Hawaii, Chantilly Cake dates back to the 1950s. Usually, Chantilly cakes are chocolate cakes with a "Chantilly frosting", which is essentially the coconut frosting from a German chocolate cake without the coconut.  This is in contrast to the typical usage of creme Chantilly, which refers to sweetened whipped cream.

See also 
 List of desserts
 List of regional dishes of the United States

References

External links 
 Ono Kine Grindz – Review of Liliha Bakery's Chantilly Cake

Chocolate desserts
American cakes